Adam Aleksander Sanguszko (1590–1653), of Pogoń Litewska, was a Ruthenian noble of the Polish–Lithuanian Commonwealth. He was the castellan of Kiev from 1618, voivode of Podole from 1621 to 1630, voivode of Wołyń from 1630 and starosta of Włodzimierz (until 1625).

His parents were Hryhoryi Sanguszko and Zofia Hołowczyńska. He married Katarzyna Uchańska (d.1650) before 1616. They had no children and the Sanguszko-Koszyrski line became extinct with Adam's death.

During the royal election in 1648 he seemed to have supported the Ruthenian Eastern Orthodox nobles and the Cossacks, arguing for the need to reform or annul the Union of Brest In 1637 he founded the Kamień Dominicans.

Notes

1590 births
1653 deaths
Adam Aleksander Sanguszko
Polish–Lithuanian Commonwealth people
Castellans of Kiev